Lieutenant General Kjeld Georg Hilligsøe Hillingsø SK BVO (born 21 April 1935) is a Danish retired general. He is also the father of the actress Ellen Hillingsø.

Biography

Early life
Hillingsø was born on 21 April 1935 to a Jewish family. His father, Knud Erhard Hillingsø Larsen (1905-1978) was Danish, and his mother Hildegard Dorthea Louise (née Bugge; died 1997), was born in Kiel, Germany. Hillingsø also had a younger brother, the fashion designer Lars Hillingsø.

Military career
Hillingsø was made a sergeant in the Royal Danish Navy in 1955, but changed to serve in the Royal Danish Army, in which he became a Lieutenant of the Danish Royal Life Guards in 1959. In 1986 he was made a colonel and became the chief of the Planning and Operations Staff in the Defence Command. In 1990, he became a Major General, and Chief of the Army. In 1991, he was made head of the newly-created Army Operational Command. In 1993 he became Lieutenant General and head of NATO's BALTAP command, and was also head of the Defence Operational Forces. He held this position until his retirement in 1995, when he was awarded the Grand Cross of the Order of the Dannebrog.

Retirement
Since 2007, Hillingsø has been the Royal Patron for the Sankt Petri Schule and St. Peter's Church, Copenhagen. 

Since his retirement, he has been a frequent commentator on topics such as the Cold War and the Iraq War, among others, in the Danish national newspaper Berlingske.

On 9 February 2000, Hillingsø was awarded the Estonian Order of the Cross of the Eagle, Third Class, by then-Estonian President Lennart Meri.

Personal life and family
Hillingsø married Ellen Birgitta Juel on 18 May 1963. They have two children together, Ellen Gunilla and Jens Georg. 

Hillingsø's daughter Ellen is an actress, perhaps best known internationally for her roles in the television series The Bridge and Rita. Hillingsø's son, Jens, is the head of the Department of Paediatric Surgery at the Rigshospitalet in Copenhagen and former chairman of Médecins sans Frontières. His daughter, Olivia, is also starting a career in acting, following in her aunt's footsteps.

Hillingsø and his wife have been long-time friends of the Queen of Denmark, Margrethe II, and her late husband, Prince Henrik. Margrethe is godmother to Hillingsø's daughter, Ellen, and Birgitta Hillingsø is also godmother to Crown Prince Frederik of Denmark.

Awards and decorations

Denmark

Germany

Estonia

Books
 Trusselsbilledet: En koldkriger taler ud. Copenhagen: Gyldendal 2004. .
 Landkrigen 1807. Copenhagen: Gyldendal, 2007. .
 Broderstrid: Danmark mod Sverige 1657-60. Copenhagen: Gyldendal 2009. .
 Generalens datter. with Ellen Hillingsø and Henriette Harris. Copenhagen: Lindhart & Ringhof. 2019. .

References

Living people
1935 births
Danish generals
Danish people of German descent
Recipients of the Order of Merit of the Federal Republic of Germany
Grand Crosses of the Order of the Dannebrog
Recipients of the Military Order of the Cross of the Eagle, Class III